
Charles Henry Crane B.A. M.A. M.D. (July 19, 1825 – October 10, 1883) was an American physician and the 13th Surgeon General of the United States Army (1882–1883). He was the son of Colonel Ichabod B. Crane

Crane received his B.A. from  Yale College in 1844. He then went to the Harvard Medical School where he received his  M.D. in 1847.  Crane joined the army from Massachusetts on February 14, 1848.

In April 1865, Crane was one of the doctors attending President Lincoln at his death.

On April 9, 1866, President Andrew Johnson nominated Crane for appointment to the grade of brevet brigadier general in the Regular Army, to rank from March 13, 1865, and the United States Senate confirmed the appointment on May 4, 1866.

On July 29, 1866 Crane was confirmed by the US. Senate to be the Assistant Surgeon General of the Army under Surgeon General Joseph K. Barnes.

Crane began to serve as Acting Surgeon General of the Army when his predecessor resigned.  Crane was subsequently nominated by President Chester A. Arthur for the permanent position.  Crane's nomination was confirmed by the United States Senate on August 7, 1882, and he formally entered into his office on August 9, 1882.

Crane served as Surgeon General of the Army until his death on October 10, 1883.  He was succeeded by Robert Murray.

See also

List of American Civil War brevet generals (Union)
List of Massachusetts generals in the American Civil War
Massachusetts in the American Civil War

References

Bibliography

 New York Times Obituary: Surgeon General Crane Dead. An Illness Which Terminates Suddenly - His Probable Successor. New York, NY: New York Times,(October 11, 1883), p. 4.
 New York Times The Senate's Executive Work. John A. Luby Confirmed as Surveyor at Albany – A new Surgeon General., New York, NY: New York Times, (August 8, 1882), p. 1.
New York Times  National Capital Topics; News and Orders for the Army and Navy., New York, NY: New York Times, August 10, 1882, p. 3.
Pilcher, James Evelyn.: The Surgeon Generals of the Army of the United States of America: A Series of Biographical Sketches of the Senior Officers of the Military Medical Service from the American Revolution to the Philippine Pacification (1905) pp. 64–66
Special Dispatches to The New York Times, Washington News.; Final Adjournment of Congress to December. Scenes and Incidents of an All Night Session. Sharp Struggle on the Omnibus Appropriation Bill. Increased Pay to Members Goes Through by One Majority. Also a Modified Extension of Bounties. Final Disposition of the Tennessee Senator's Case. Mr. Patterson Permitted to Take the Oath if He Chooses. Passage of the Army Bill Making a Large Increase of Force. The President Supposed to Have Pocketed the Nebraska Bill., New York, NY: New York Times, (July 29, 1866), p. 1.

External links

1825 births
1883 deaths
American military personnel of the Mexican–American War
Harvard Medical School alumni
Members of the Aztec Club of 1847
People associated with the assassination of Abraham Lincoln
People from Newport, Rhode Island
People of Massachusetts in the American Civil War
People of Rhode Island in the American Civil War
Physicians from Rhode Island
Surgeons General of the United States Army
Union Army generals
United States Army Medical Corps officers
Yale College alumni
Crane family of New Jersey